The  was a derivative of the Type 97 Chi-Ha medium tanks of the Imperial Japanese Army in World War II. Similar in concept to the early variants of the German Panzer IV, it was designed as a self-propelled howitzer to provide the close-in fire support for standard Japanese medium tanks with additional firepower against enemy anti-tank fortifications.

History and development

Design work on the Type 2 Ho-I began in 1937, after experience in Manchukuo taught Japanese war planners that an armored vehicle with a larger weapon would be useful against fortified enemy positions such as pillboxes, against which the standard low-velocity 57mm and high-velocity 47mm tank guns were ineffective. Since this vehicle was to be able to keep up with the rest of an armored formation, the Japanese began work on mounting a Type 41 75 mm Mountain Gun onto the chassis of the Chi-Ha medium tank. The adapted mountain gun, known as the Type 99 75 mm tank gun, was completed in 1940. The gun could fire an assortment of ammunition, including a 6.6kg (14.5lb) armor-piercing shell and had a muzzle velocity of 445mps. By 1942 the Type 99 75 mm gun was fitted into a Type 97-Kai Shinhoto Chi-Ha turret, which resulted in the designated Type 2 Ho-I gun tank. The Type 2 Ho-I gun tank was intended to be part of a fire support company in each of the tank regiments.

Design

The 1941 prototype model, known as the Experimental Type 1 Ho-I, used the Type 97 Chi-Ha chassis. The production model utilized the chassis of the Type 1 Chi-He medium tank, which was itself a modified Type 97 Chi-Ha hull.

The main armament of the Type 2 Ho-I was a Type 99 75 mm tank gun, and secondary armament was a single 7.7 mm Type 97 Light Machine Gun in the hull. The short barreled 75 mm Type 99 Gun was mounted in a gun turret of the type used for the Type 97 Shinhoto Chi-Ha tank with modifications to accommodate the gun used and the addition of a large rear hatch.

Service history
As with other tanks and self-propelled guns, production was hampered by material shortages, and by the bombing of Japan in World War II. All 31 Type 2 Ho-I tanks produced were conversions from existing Type 1 Chi-He medium tanks. There is no record of a Type 2 Ho-I being used in combat prior to the end of the war.

Notes

References

External links
History of War.org
Taki's Imperial Japanese Army Page - Akira Takizawa
World War II drawings

Further reading

World War II tank destroyers
Type 2 Ho-I
2 Ho-I
Military vehicles introduced from 1940 to 1944